Yu Zhuocheng (born December 7, 1975, in Guangdong) is a male diver from PR China. Yu won a silver medal in the 3 metre springboard diving at the 1996 Summer Olympic Games.

References

External links

1975 births
Living people
Chinese male divers
Divers at the 1996 Summer Olympics
Olympic silver medalists for China
Olympic divers of China
Olympic medalists in diving
Asian Games medalists in diving
Divers at the 1994 Asian Games
Divers at the 1998 Asian Games
Sportspeople from Guangdong
Asian Games silver medalists for China
Medalists at the 1994 Asian Games
Medalists at the 1998 Asian Games
Medalists at the 1996 Summer Olympics
World Aquatics Championships medalists in diving
21st-century Chinese people
20th-century Chinese people